Nikolay Volkov may refer to:

 Nikolay Mikhaylovich Volkov, governor of the Jewish Autonomous Oblast, Russia
 , actor
 , actor, son of the above
 Nikolai Volkoff (1947–2018), ring name of an American professional wrestler of Yugoslav origin